Island council elections were held in the Netherlands Antilles on 12 April 1991 to elect the members of the island councils of its five island territories. The election was won by the Bonaire Patriotic Union (6 seats) in Bonaire, the National People's Party (10 seats) in Curaçao, the Windward Islands People's Movement (4 seats) in Saba, and the Sint Maarten Patriotic Alliance (4 seats) in Sint Maarten.

Results

Bonaire

Curaçao

Saba

Sint Maarten
The Sint Maarten Patriotic Alliance (SPA) led by Vance James Jr. emerged as the largest party, winning 4 of the 9 seats. The SPA and the Progressive Democratic Party (PDP) agreed to form a coalition government. On 28 August 1991 the SPA–PDP government collapsed. PDP political leader Millicent Acuna Lopez-de Weever said that "fundamental philosophical differences" with the SPA caused the coalition "to break".

References

Netehrlands
1991 in the Netherlands Antilles
1991 in Sint Maarten
April 1991 events in North America
Elections in the Netherlands Antilles
Elections in Bonaire
Elections in Curaçao
Elections in Saba (island)
Elections in Sint Eustatius
Elections in Sint Maarten
Election and referendum articles with incomplete results